Eleutherine is a genus of herbaceous, perennial and bulbous plants in the family Iridaceae, first described as a genus in 1843. It is native to Latin America and the West Indies.

The genus name may be derived from the Greek word eleuthera, meaning "free".

 Species
 Eleutherine angusta Ravenna - Paraguay, Mato Grosso do Sul
 Eleutherine bulbosa (Mill.) Urb. - West Indies, South America; naturalized in Zaire, Réunion, India, Cambodia, Vietnam 
 Eleutherine citriodora (Ravenna) Ravenna - Bolivia, northern Argentina
 Eleutherine latifolia (Standl. & L.O.Williams) Ravenna - Mexico, Central America, Bolivia, northern Argentina

References

 Peter Goldblatt and Neil Snow. 1991. Systematics and Chromosome Cytology of Eleutherine Herbert (Iridaceae). Annals of the Missouri Botanical Garden, Vol. 78, No. 4 (1991), pp. 942–949.

Iridaceae genera
Iridaceae